Mary B Mitchell was a British schooner completed in 1892 that served as a Q-ship during the First World War. She was in service from April 1916 until the end of hostilities, operating in the Southwest Approaches from her base in Falmouth. She had several encounters with German U-boats in her career, and was credited with the destruction of two, though post-war analysis established that no U-boats were sunk. She had a reputation for being an efficient and successful vessel.

After the war she returned to merchant service but was wrecked in 1944.

Early career

Mary B Mitchell was built by Paul Rogers in 1892 at Carrickfergus, as a three-masted topsail schooner. She was owned by Lord Penrhyn and served for a period as a yacht, before being put to work as a coaster. In 1916 she was requisitioned by the Admiralty to be used as a Q-ship.

Service history:World War One
In April 1916 she was at Falmouth, where she was requisitioned for service as a Q-ship. She was armed and outfitted, under the command of Lt. M Armstrong RNR, to carry a 12-pounder and two 6-pounder guns as well as two machine guns and small arms.
She commissioned on 5 May 1916 and sailed on her first patrol on 26 June, returning to Falmouth on 25 July.
During this period she sailed the usual sea routes in the Channel and the Southwest Approaches, masquerading as a merchant ship and inviting attack by a German U-boat.
Over the following months she undertook  a series of such patrols, in a variety of disguises.  Great success was claimed

On 20 June 1917, under the command of Lt J Lawrie and in the guise of the French schooner Eider, she encountered a U-boat sailing west of Brittany, which approached and opened fire. Mitchell carried out her role as a decoy, being hove to and abandoned until he U-boat was within 600 yards, when she returned fire scoring several hits. At this the U-boat dived and was not seen again. The U-boat, later identified as UC-65, was not damaged.
That evening, Mitchell had a further encounter, which unfolded in the same way, though on this occasion the U-boat was more wary, and Mitchell's crew had a more difficult time before scoring hits on their assailant.  This U-boat, UC-17, was also not damaged.

On 3 August 1917 Mitchell had her third encounter, sailing south of Start Point in the guise of the French schooner Cancalais. She encountered a U-boat, UC-75, which approached, opening fire at a range of nearly three miles. Mitchell's crew again hove to and the panic party abandoned ship, while the gun crews waited for their target to come into range. However the U-boat was too cautious, and after being shelled for fifteen minutes, Lawrie elected to clear away and close under engine power. Mitchell was able to score some hits before the U-boat disappeared, but no loss was confirmed.
For these actions Lawrie was awarded the DSO.

Later career

Mary B Mitchell was decommissioned in 1919 and returned to merchant service.
She appeared in the 1935 Hammer film The Mystery of the Mary Celeste as the Mary Celeste.

She had a long career surviving into the Second World War. In December 1944 she was wrecked in a gale in the Solway Firth and written off.

Commemoration

The Mary B Mitchell is commemorated in Bangor, Wales, by a memorial plaque and a bronze weathervane which adorns the city’s new shopping precinct. It was designed and made by Ann Catrin Evans and Roger Wyn Evans. The plaque gives a brief account of the ships history, while the weathervane depicts her in silhouette.

Assessment
The Mary B Mitchell had a good reputation as a Q-ship following the First World War, being credited with the destruction of two U-boats. This reputation has persisted to this day, although post-war analysis showed neither of the U-boats she engaged had been sunk, and that her achievement had been overestimated.

Opinions differ on the effectiveness of the Q-ships. One source regards them as greatly overrated, diverting skilled seamen from other duties without sinking enough U-boats to justify the strategy, while another suggests Q-ships were all the more important in the early stages of the fight against the U-boat because so few methods had appeared to work, though their effectiveness declined as the war at sea progressed.

See also 
 SMS Seeadler (auxiliary cruiser)

References

Bibliography
 Chatterton, E Keble : Q-Ships and their story. (1922) ISBN (none)
 
 
Halpern, Paul (1995) A Naval History of World War I Routledge

External links

Q-ships of the Royal Navy
1892 ships